Emma Cumming (born 20 February 1998) is a New Zealand racing cyclist. She represented her country at the 2018 Commonwealth Games, claiming the silver medal in the team sprint (with Natasha Hansen) and the bronze medal in the track time trial.

Biography 
Cumming was born at Southland (Kew) Hospital in Invercargill in 1998. She was educated at Southland Girls' High School.

At the 2015 Junior Track World Championships, Cumming won silver alongside Olivia Podmore in the team sprint. A year later at the 2016 Junior Track World Championships, she won gold alongside Ellesse Andrews in the team sprint.

Cumming rode in the women's team sprint event at the 2018 UCI Track Cycling World Championships.

At the 2018 Commonwealth Games, Cumming competed in the individual sprint, team sprint, keirin and time trial. She claimed the silver medal in the team sprint with Natasha Hansen, and the bronze medal in thetime trial.

In mid-2018, Cumming tore her left acetabular labrum and developed tendonitis in her hip abductor muscles. She required hip surgery which sidelined her for the 2019 season.

References

External links 
 

1998 births
Living people
Commonwealth Games medallists in cycling
Commonwealth Games silver medallists for New Zealand
Cyclists at the 2018 Commonwealth Games
New Zealand female cyclists
Cyclists from Invercargill
New Zealand track cyclists
People educated at Southland Girls' High School
21st-century New Zealand women
Medallists at the 2018 Commonwealth Games